In enzymology, a pyridoxine 4-dehydrogenase is an enzyme that catalyzes the chemical reaction

pyridoxine + NADP+  pyridoxal + NADPH + H+

Thus, the two substrates of this enzyme are pyridoxine and NADP+, whereas its 3 products are pyridoxal, NADPH, and H+.

This enzyme belongs to the family of oxidoreductases, specifically those acting on the CH-OH group of donor with NAD+ or NADP+ as acceptor. The systematic name of this enzyme class is pyridoxine:NADP+ 4-oxidoreductase. Other names in common use include pyridoxin dehydrogenase, pyridoxol dehydrogenase, and pyridoxine dehydrogenase. This enzyme participates in vitamin B6 metabolism.

References

 

EC 1.1.1
NADPH-dependent enzymes
Enzymes of unknown structure